World Series of Fighting 9: Carl vs. Palhares was a mixed martial arts event held  in Paradise, Nevada, United States.

Background
This event was  headlined by reigning Welterweight Champion Steve Carl making the first title defense of his career. Taking Carl will be former UFC vet Rousimar Palhares, who fought for the first time since his release from the UFC in October 2013.

The inaugural Bantamweight Championship was decided in the co-main event which featured Marlon Moraes taking on Josh Rettinghouse. Moraes was coming off a 32-second knockout over Carson Beebe at WSOF 6. Rettinghouse came off his decision victory over Bellator MMA veteran Alexis Vila.

Also on the card, making his first appearance since his release from the UFC, Yushin Okami took on Bulgarian fighter Svetlozar Savov in his WSOF debut, winning the fight by Submission (arm triangle choke) in the second round.

Results

See also 
 World Series of Fighting
 List of WSOF champions
 List of WSOF events

References

World Series of Fighting events
2014 in mixed martial arts
Mixed martial arts in Las Vegas
Events in Paradise, Nevada